The blackish oystercatcher (Haematopus ater) is a species of wading bird in the oystercatcher family Haematopodidae. It is found in Argentina, Chile, the Falkland Islands and Peru, and is a vagrant to Uruguay. The population is estimated at 15,000–80,000.

Description
The plumage of the blackish oystercatcher is slaty-black with wings and back being rather dark brown. The long bill is blood-red and the legs are white. The sexes are similar in appearance. The blackish oystercatcher is easily overlooked on a rocky shore. Its dark colour blends in with the colour of the rocks on which it walks as it forages, and it does not draw attention to itself. Its presence, however, can easily be detected by its loud and distinctive warning calls.  The song of the blackish oystercatcher, when given in duet, consists of an excited chatter of piping whistles. Calls include notes that sound like "pip"  and "peeeeyeeee".

Distribution and habitat
The blackish oystercatcher is native to the coasts of Argentina, Chile, the Falkland Islands and Peru, and it is a vagrant to Uruguay. The natural habitats of the blackish oystercatcher are rocky shores. It feeds in the intertidal zone on rocky shorelines, in rockpools and on pebble beaches. Rarely, it can be found on sandy beaches hunting for mole crabs.

Status
The IUCN rates the blackish oystercatcher as being of "Least Concern". It is not clear whether the population is increasing or decreasing, but the bird has a very large range and a total population estimated to be somewhere between 15,000 and 80,000 individuals.

Gallery

See also
Black oystercatcher

References

 Mundo Azul 2011. Mundo Azul species profile sheet: Blackish oystercatcher

blackish oystercatcher
Western South American coastal birds
Birds of Chile
Birds of the Falkland Islands
Birds of Patagonia
Birds of Peru
Birds of Tierra del Fuego
blackish oystercatcher
Taxonomy articles created by Polbot
blackish oystercatcher